Thomas Gerding (born December 17, 1978) is an American former sprinter.

References

1978 births
Living people
American male sprinters
Universiade medalists in athletics (track and field)
Universiade gold medalists for the United States
Medalists at the 2001 Summer Universiade
Place of birth missing (living people)